"Chanté's Got a Man" is the first single from American singer Chanté Moore's third studio album, This Moment Is Mine (1999). Featuring an interpolation of the 1971 Osmonds number-one single "One Bad Apple", the song became Moore's first top-10 single on the US Billboard Hot 100, reaching number 10. The song earned a Soul Train Music Award nomination for "Single of the Year, Female".

Track listing
US CD and cassette single
 "Chanté's Got a Man"
 "Your Home Is in My Heart (Stella's Love Theme)" (with Boyz II Men)

Charts

Weekly charts

Year-end charts

Certifications

|}

Release history

References

Chanté Moore songs
1999 singles
1999 songs
MCA Records singles
Silas Records singles
Song recordings produced by Jimmy Jam and Terry Lewis
Songs written by Chanté Moore
Songs written by George Jackson (songwriter)
Songs written by Jimmy Jam and Terry Lewis